Foni Kansala is one of the nine districts of the Gambia's West Coast Region, which is located to the south of the Gambia River in the southwest of the country. Foni Kansala is in the southeast of the division, between Foni Bintang-Karenai and Foni Bondali.

References 

West Coast Division (The Gambia)
Districts of the Gambia